Liatris oligocephala, the Cahaba torch, is a flowering plant in the genus Liatris (blazing stars).  Its native range is very small, with all known populations being within Bibb County, Alabama, and therefore the species is of conservation concern.  It hybridizes with the much more common Liatris cylindracea, but the offspring do not appear to cross with L. oligocephala.

References

oligocephala
Flora of Alabama
Endemic flora of the United States
Plants described in 2001